Diana Patricia Broce Bravo (born 28 July 1986) (Las Tablas, Los Santos) is beauty pageant titleholder from Panama.

She represented Panama at the 58th Miss Universe 2009.

References

Miss Universe 2009 contestants
1986 births
Living people
Panamanian beauty pageant winners
Señorita Panamá